(German Museum of Technology) in Berlin, Germany is a museum of science and technology, and exhibits a large collection of historical technical artifacts. The museum's main emphasis originally was on rail transport, but today it also features exhibits of various sorts of industrial technology. In 2003, it opened both maritime and aviation exhibition halls in a newly built extension. The museum also contains a science center called Spectrum.

History
The Museum of Traffic and Technology was founded in 1982 and assumed the tradition of the Royal Museum of Traffic and Construction which was opened in the former  station building in 1906.

Renamed  in 1996, the exhibition area was gradually expanded.

Collections

Locomotives 

An extensive railway collection opened in 1987/88 in the rebuilt 19th century roundhouses of the Anhalter Bahnhof locomotive depot that had lain derelict for about 30 years. The exhibition also features a H0 scale model of the  track installations.

Locomotives on display include:

Steam 

 17 008, a Prussian S 10, which has been sectioned.
 50 001 of DRB Class 50

Other 

 E 19 01, one of four members of DRG Class E 19 (1938)
 118 075 of DR Class V 180
 V 200 018, of DB Class V 200 (1957)
 202 003-0, one of three Henschel-BBC DE2500 prototypes (1971 or 1974)

Aircraft 

A large aviation section beside the C-47 houses numerous aircraft from the single  to a Lufthansa Junkers Ju 52 and an Arado Ar 79. The museum addresses the flight enthusiasm of the early 20th century and its abuse in the German re-armament building up the Luftwaffe, documented by an Arado Ar 96, a wrecked Junkers Ju 87 Stuka dive bomber and the current restoration of a Focke-Wulf Fw 200 Condor as well as by one of three preserved Messerschmitt Bf 110, a Flak cannon, and a V-1 flying bomb built by Mittelbau-Dora concentration camp inmates at the Mittelwerk site. Post-war aircraft including a VFW-Fokker 614 and the Cessna 172P that Mathias Rust flew to the Moscow Red Square during the Cold War have also been added to the exhibition.

The remains of Lancaster B III JA914 are displayed. This aircraft served with 57 Squadron as DX-O. It was shot down over Berlin in September 1943 and crashed into a lake opposite Zahrensdorf.

Computers 

On 15 May 2002, a special exhibition opened which featured the inventions of computer pioneer Konrad Zuse, including a replica of the Z1 and several other Zuse computers.

Buildings 

The museum has two windmills (one German, one Dutch), a brewery, and a forge powered by a water wheel.

References

External links

 Museum website
 Spectrum: the Science Center

Technology museums in Germany
Aerospace museums in Germany
Maritime museums in Germany
National museums of Germany
Railway museums in Germany
Science museums in Germany
Museums in Berlin
Buildings and structures in Friedrichshain-Kreuzberg